Dickson Abiama (born 3 November 1998) is a Nigerian professional footballer who plays as a centre-forward for Bundesliga club Greuther Fürth.

Career
Abiama made his debut for Greuther Fürth in the first round of the 2020–21 DFB-Pokal on 12 September 2020, coming on as a substitute in the 72nd minute for Branimir Hrgota against fifth-division side RSV Meinerzhagen. He scored two goals in the 113th and 118th minutes to secure a 6–1 win for Fürth after extra time. He made his 2. Bundesliga debut the following week on 20 September, once against coming on as a substitute for Hrgota in the 89th minute of Fürth's home match against VfL Osnabrück, which finished as a 1–1 draw.

On 23 May 2021, on the final matchday of the 2. Bundesliga season, Abiama scored the winning goal in the 83rd minute of a 3–2 home victory versus Fortuna Düsseldorf, even as Greuther Fürth only had 10 men on the pitch. Abiama's winner would ultimately prove to be the decisive goal that secured Fürth automatic promotion to the Bundesliga for 2021–22, as the win against Düsseldorf elevated Fürth from third place in the division (the promotion play-off spot), to second.

References

External links
 
 
 
 Dickson Abiama at Bavarian Football Association
 SpVgg Mögeldorf 2016–17 season statistics
 SpVgg Mögeldorf 2017–18 season statistics

1998 births
Living people
Nigerian footballers
Association football forwards
SG Quelle Fürth players
SC Eltersdorf players
SpVgg Greuther Fürth players
Bundesliga players
2. Bundesliga players